Comedy Nights Bachao (English: Comedy Nights, Help!) is an Indian Hindi-language comedy television series which premiered on 5 September 2015. The series used to air on Sunday nights on Colors TV. The series was a reality show with a format similar to Comedy Circus. It had many of the same production team members and was produced by Optimystix Entertainment. The presenters of this show were Krushna Abhishek, Sudesh Lehri, Bharti Singh Mubeen and Mona Singh

Cast

Season 1 (Comedy Nights Bachao)
 Krushna Abhishek
 Sudesh Lehri
 Bharti Singh
 Mubeen Saudagar
 Anita Hassanandani
 Karan Wahi
 Puja Banerjee
 Shruti Seth
 Shakeel Siddiqui
 Adaa Khan
 Naseem Vicky
 Pritam Singh
 Sara Khan
Cameos
 Surbhi Jyoti for 2 episodes
 Siddharth Jadhav for 2 episodes
 Raghu Ram for 2 episodes
 Rajiv Laxman for 2 episodes
 Manan Desai for 1 episode
 Shikha Singh for 1 episode
 Aastha Gill for 1 episode

Season 2 (Comedy Nights Bachao Taaza) 
 Krushna Abhishek
 Bharti Singh
 Sudesh Lehri
 Mubeen Saudagar
 Adaa Khan
 Puja Banerjee
 Anita Hassanandani
 Karan Wahi
 Nia Sharma
 Balraj Sayal
 Aditi Bhatia
 Mona Singh as host
 Amruta Khanvilkar
 Sumeet Vyas
 Sharad Malhotra
 Asha Negi
 Manan Desai
Cameos
 Ruhanika Dhawan for 1 episode
 Shivansh Kotia for 1 episode
 Parth Bhalerao for 1 episode
 Asrani for 1 episode
 Helly Shah for 1 episode
 Karishma Tanna for 1 episode

List of episodes

References

2015 Indian television series debuts
Hindi-language television shows
Indian stand-up comedy television series
Colors TV original programming
Television series by Optimystix Entertainment